Little Sachigo Lake is a lake in Unorganized Kenora District in Northwestern Ontario, Canada. It is on the Sachigo River and is part of the Hudson Bay drainage basin.

The major inflow, from the south, and outflow, at the east, is the Sachigo River, which flows via the Severn River to Hudson Bay.

See also
List of lakes in Ontario

References

Lakes of Kenora District